Pulchritia is a monotypic genus of rotifers belonging to the family Trichotriidae. The only species is Pulchritia dorsicornuta.

References

Rotifers